Wessel Keemink (born 29 May 1993) is a Dutch professional volleyball player. He is a member of the Dutch national team. At the professional club level, he plays for ČEZ Karlovarsko.

Honours
 National championships
 2018/2019  Italian SuperCup, with Azimut Leo Shoes Modena
 2020/2021  Czech Championship, with ČEZ Karlovarsko
 2021/2022  Czech SuperCup, with ČEZ Karlovarsko
 2021/2022  Czech Championship, with ČEZ Karlovarsko
 2022/2023  Czech SuperCup, with ČEZ Karlovarsko

References

External links

 
 Player profile at LegaVolley.it  
 Player profile at Volleybox.net

1993 births
Living people
Sportspeople from Schiedam
Dutch men's volleyball players
Dutch expatriate sportspeople in Belgium
Expatriate volleyball players in Belgium
Dutch expatriate sportspeople in Italy
Expatriate volleyball players in Italy
Expatriate volleyball players in Montenegro
Dutch expatriate sportspeople in the Czech Republic
Expatriate volleyball players in the Czech Republic
Setters (volleyball)